October 15 - Eastern Orthodox liturgical calendar - October 17

All fixed commemorations below celebrated on October 29 by Eastern Orthodox Churches on the Old Calendar.

For October 16th, Orthodox Churches on the Old Calendar commemorate the Saints listed on October 3.

Saints
 Martyr Longinus the Centurion who stood at the Cross of the Lord and at his Tomb (1st century)
 Martyrs Isaurus and Aphrodisius, who suffered with St. Longinus (1st century)
 Saints Leontius, Dometius, Terence and Domninus, martyrs by fire.
 Venerable Malus the Hermit.

Pre-Schism Western saints
 Saint Eliphius (Eloff), born in Ireland, he was martyred in Toul in France under Julian the Apostate (362)
 Saint Bolonia, a holy virgin aged fifteen and martyred under Julian the Apostate (362)
 Saint Florentinus of Trier, successor of St Severinus as Bishop of Trier in Germany (4th century)
 Saint Dulcidius (Dulcet, Doucis), successor of St Phoebadius as Bishop of Agen in France (c. 450)
 220 Martyrs of North-West Africa.
 Martys Saturninus, Nereus and Companions, a group of some 365 martyrs who suffered in North Africa under the Vandal King Genseric (450)
 Martyrs Martinian, Saturian and Companions, under Genseric in North Africa (458)
 Saint Conogan, the successor of St Corentin as Bishop of Quimper in Brittany (460)
 Saint Junian, a hermit in Commodoliacus (now Saint-Junien), near Limoges in France (5th century)
 Saint Gallus, monk of Bangor Monastery and Enlightener of Switzerland (c. 646)
 Saint Magnobodus (Mainboeuf), Bishop of Angers in France (c. 670) 
 Saint Baldwin (Baudoin), martyr (c. 680)
 Saint Mummolin (Mommolinus), Bishop of Noyon-Tournai in Belgium (c. 686)
 Saint Bercharius, a monk at Luxeuil Abbey and first Abbot of Hautvillers and martyr (696)
 Saint Balderic (Baudry), children of Sigebert I, King of Austrasia (7th century)
 Saint Eremberta, niece of St Wulmar and first Abbess of Wierre in France (late 7th century)
 Saint Vitalis (Vial), Hermit, Confessor (740)
 Saint Ambrose, thirteenth Bishop of Cahors in France (c. 752)
 Saint Lullus, the first permanent Archbishop of Mainz, succeeding Saint Boniface, Confessor (787)

Post-Schism Orthodox saints
 Saint Eupraxia, Abbess, before tonsure Princess Euphrosyne of Pskov (1243)
 Venerable Longinus the Gate-keeper of the Kiev Caves (13th-14th centuries)
 Venerables John and Longinus of Yarenga, monks of Solovetsky Monastery (1544-45 or 1569)  <small>(see also: July 3)</small>
 New Martyr John of Tourkolekas (1816)<ref>Holy New Martyr John of Tourkoleka (+1816). Mystagogy. October 16, 2013.</ref>
 Blessed Domna (Slipchenko) of Tomsk, Fool-for-Christ, of Tomsk (1872)

New Martys and Confessors
 Saint George Troitsky, Confessor, Priest (1931)
 New Hieromartyr Eugene Yelkhovsky, Priest (1937)
 New Hieromartyr Alexei Nikonov, Priest (1938)
 New Hieromartyr John Zasyedatelev, Priest (1942)

Other commemorations
 Repose of Patriarch Adrian of Moscow (1700)
 Repose of Abbot Neonil of Neamț Monastery, Romania (1853)

Icon gallery

Notes

References

Sources 
 October 16/29. Orthodox Calendar (PRAVOSLAVIE.RU).
 October 29 / October 16. HOLY TRINITY RUSSIAN ORTHODOX CHURCH (A parish of the Patriarchate of Moscow).
 October 16. OCA - The Lives of the Saints.
 The Autonomous Orthodox Metropolia of Western Europe and the Americas (ROCOR). St. Hilarion Calendar of Saints for the year of our Lord 2004. St. Hilarion Press (Austin, TX). p. 77.
 The Sixteenth Day of the Month of October. Orthodoxy in China.
 October 16. Latin Saints of the Orthodox Patriarchate of Rome.
 The Roman Martyrology. Transl. by the Archbishop of Baltimore. Last Edition, According to the Copy Printed at Rome in 1914. Revised Edition, with the Imprimatur of His Eminence Cardinal Gibbons. Baltimore: John Murphy Company, 1916. pp. 319–320.
 Rev. Richard Stanton. A Menology of England and Wales, or, Brief Memorials of the Ancient British and English Saints Arranged According to the Calendar, Together with the Martyrs of the 16th and 17th Centuries. London: Burns & Oates, 1892. pp. 494–498.
Greek Sources
 Great Synaxaristes:  16 ΟΚΤΩΒΡΙΟΥ. ΜΕΓΑΣ ΣΥΝΑΞΑΡΙΣΤΗΣ.
  Συναξαριστής. 16 Οκτωβρίου. ECCLESIA.GR. (H ΕΚΚΛΗΣΙΑ ΤΗΣ ΕΛΛΑΔΟΣ).
  16/10/2017. Ορθόδοξος Συναξαριστής. 
Russian Sources
  29 октября (16 октября). Православная Энциклопедия под редакцией Патриарха Московского и всея Руси Кирилла (электронная версия). (Orthodox Encyclopedia - Pravenc.ru).
  16 октября по старому стилю / 29 октября по новому стилю. Русская Православная Церковь - Православный церковный календарь на 2016 год.

October in the Eastern Orthodox calendar